Aliyu is both a given name and a surname. Notable people with the name include:

Given name
Aliyu Abubakar, Nigerian politician
Aliyu Abubakar (footballer) (born 1996), Nigerian footballer
Aliyu Attah, Nigerian police officer
Aliyu Babba (died 1926), Emir of Kano
Aliyu Bawa (born 1991), Nigerian footballer
Aliyu Doma (born 1942), Nigerian politician
Aliyu Ibrahim, Nigerian footballer
Aliyu Kama (born 1949), Nigerian general
Aliyu Mohammed Gusau (born 1943), Nigerian Army officer
Aliyu Mai-Bornu (1919–1970), Nigerian economist
Aliyu Musa (born 1957), Nigerian politician
Aliyu Obaje (1920–2012), Nigerian traditional ruler
Aliyu Okechukwu (born 1995), Nigerian footballer
Aliyu Modibbo Umar (born 1958), Nigerian politician
Aliyu Magatakarda Wamakko (born 1953), Nigerian politician

Surname
Abdullahi Aliyu, Nigerian civil servant
Akilu Aliyu (1918–1999), Nigerian poet, writer, scholar and politician
Dabo Aliyu (born 1947), Nigerian politician
Hadiza Aliyu (born 1989), Nigerian actress
Ibrahim Aliyu, Nigerian general
Mohammed Goyi Aliyu (born 1993), Nigerian footballer
Mu'azu Babangida Aliyu (born 1955), Nigerian politician
Nasiru Aliyu (born 1990), Nigerian footballer
Surnames of Nigerian origin

Nigerian masculine given names